Ostružnja Donja is a village in the municipality of Stanari, Bosnia and Herzegovina.

References

Villages in Republika Srpska
Populated places in Doboj